The International Organization for Medical Physics (IOMP) is a professional organization for medical physics with nearly 22,000 members in 84 countries.

Objectives and History

IOMP is charged with a mission to advance medical physics practice worldwide by disseminating scientific and technical information, fostering the educational and professional development of medical physics and promoting the highest quality medical services for patients.

IOMP was formed in January 1963 initially with 4 affiliated national member organizations (Canada, Sweden, UK, USA). After 50 years of active existence and global support for the medical physics profession, IOMP has a membership of 80 national member organizations and 6 regional organizations. IOMP is affiliated to IUPESM, IUPAP and ICSU and is officially connected to IFMBE.

IOMP collaborates with professional bodies such as IRPA and ICRP and international organizations such as WHO and IAEA in promoting the development of medical physics and safe use of radiation and radiological equipment technology.

IOMP publishes an electronic Newsletter (Medical Physics World) and an open-source journal (Medical Physics International).

To raise awareness about the role medical physicists play for the benefit of patients, IOMP organizes the annual International Day of Medical Physics (IDMP) on November 7 - the birthday of Marie Sklodowska-Curie.

The World Congress on Medical Physics and Biomedical Engineering (World Congress) is organised by IOMP (together with IFMBE and IUPESM) as well as the International Congress of Medical Physics (ICMP), held between World Congresses.

IOMP Member Countries

Countries are represented by the respective National Organizations for Medical Physics.

Regional organizations
European Federation of Organisations for Medical Physics (EFOMP)
Asia-Oceania Federation of Organizations for Medical Physics (AFOMP)
Latin American Medical Physics Association (ALFIM)
Southeast Asian Federation of Organizations of Medical Physics (SEAFOMP)
Federation of African Medical Physics Organisations (FAMPO)
Middle East Federation of Organisations for Medical Physics (MEFOMP)

References

Medical physics organizations
Organisations based in York
Scientific organizations established in 1963
1963 establishments in the United Kingdom